Governor Bigler may refer to:

John Bigler (1805–1871), 3rd Governor of California
William Bigler (1814–1880), 12th Governor of Pennsylvania